Eva-Lena Lundgren (born 1961) is a Swedish model, and a former Miss Sweden 1981.
Later in 1981 she finished in third place at the Miss Universe 1981 pageant and fourth place at Miss Europe. Lundgren was awarded the Miss Scandinavia crown the same year in Helsinki, Finland.

She later became Eva-Lena Pilotti. , she was a Montessori Latin and Greek teacher in Amsterdam, Netherlands, and had three children.

References

1961 births
Language teachers
Latin-language education
Living people
Miss Europe
Miss Universe 1981 contestants
Miss Sweden winners
Montessori teachers
People from Piteå
Swedish schoolteachers
Dutch schoolteachers
Swedish emigrants to the Netherlands